Merlinius brevidens is a plant pathogenic nematode infecting barley and sorghum.

See also 
 List of barley diseases
 List of sorghum diseases

References

External links 
 Nemaplex, University of California - Merlinius brevidens

Tylenchida
Barley diseases
Sorghum diseases
Agricultural pest nematodes